I'm Up is the second commercial mixtape by American rapper Young Thug. It was released on February 5, 2016, by 300 Entertainment and Atlantic Records. The mixtape features guest appearances from Trouble, Ralo, Lil Durk, Lil Duke, Solo Lucci, Young Butta, Quavo, Offset, Dora, and Dolly, with the latter two being Young Thug's sisters.

Commercial performance 
I'm Up debuted at number 22 on the Billboard 200, with first week sales of 21,000 copies. It was the seventeenth highest-selling album of that week domestically.

Track listing 

Notes
"Family" features an outro by Trouble

Charts

References

Young Thug albums
2016 albums
2016 mixtape albums